Persatuan Sepakbola Aceh Barat Daya (simply known as Persada Abdya or Persada) is an Indonesian football club based in Southwest Aceh Regency, Aceh. They currently compete in the Liga 3 and their homeground is Guhang Raya Stadium.

References

External links
Persada Abdya Instagram

Football clubs in Indonesia
Football clubs in Aceh